Clarisse Moh (born 6 December 1986 in Paris) is a French athlete, who specializes in the 800 metres.

Biography  
She won the 800 metres at the French Championships in 2011 and 2013. During the 2013 Mediterranean Games, at Myrtle she won the bronze medal in the 4 × 400 m relay.

Prize list

Records

Notes and references

External links  
 

1986 births
Living people
French female middle-distance runners
Athletes from Paris
Mediterranean Games bronze medalists for France
Mediterranean Games medalists in athletics
Athletes (track and field) at the 2013 Mediterranean Games
21st-century French women